"You Wanted Someone to Play With (I Wanted Someone to Love)" is a song by Frankie Laine from his 1967 album I Wanted Someone to Love.

Charts

Yearly charts

References 

Frankie Laine songs